Operation Mavhoterapapi, was a large scale Zimbabwean government campaign to punish those who supposedly voted for the Movement for Democratic Change in the 2008 presidential election rather than for ZANU-PF.

However, the campaign met with harsh condemnation from Zimbabwean opposition parties, church groups, non-governmental organizations, and the wider international community.

See also
 Operation Dzikisai Madhishi

References

2008 in Zimbabwe
History of Zimbabwe
Law enforcement in Zimbabwe
Political repression in Zimbabwe
Politics of Zimbabwe
2008 Zimbabwean general election
Society of Zimbabwe